"Storm" is a song performed by singer SuRie, and represented the United Kingdom in the Eurovision Song Contest 2018 in Lisbon, Portugal. The song is written and composed by Nicole Blair, Gil Lewis and Sean Hargreaves. An updated version was released as a download on 7 March.

Eurovision Song Contest

SuRie was announced as the British act for the 2018 contest on 7 February 2018, after being selected to represent the United Kingdom on Eurovision: You Decide. As the United Kingdom is a member of the Big Five, SuRie directly qualified for and performed in the final of the Eurovision Song Contest on 12 May 2018.

During her performance of the song at the final, SuRie's microphone was taken by a stage invader, who then yelled into the microphone "modern Nazis of the UK media, we demand freedom, war is not peace", before being dragged offstage by security and taken into custody shortly afterwards. She was given the opportunity to perform again by the EBU but declined, stating that she was proud of her performance.

Track listing

Charts

Release history

References

External links

Eurovision songs of 2018
2018 songs
Eurovision songs of the United Kingdom
2018 singles